The 2020–21 Hong Kong FA Cup is the 46th edition of the Hong Kong FA Cup. Eight teams were divided into two groups, with the top two finishers in each group advancing to the semi-finals. The competition is only open to clubs who participate in the 2020–21 Hong Kong Premier League.

However, due to the COVID-19 pandemic in Hong Kong, the HKFA announced on 12 February 2021 that the current edition of the HKFA Cup would be cancelled.

Calendar

Bracket

Bold = winner
* = after extra time, = penalty shootout score

Fixtures and results

Group stage

Group A

Group B

Semi-finals

Final

References

2020-21
FA Cup
2020–21 domestic association football cups
Hong Kong
Hong Kong